The 1979 European Super Cup was played between Nottingham Forest and Barcelona, with Nottingham Forest winning 2–1 on aggregate.

Match details

First leg

Second leg

See also
1979 European Cup Final
1979 European Cup Winners' Cup Final
FC Barcelona in international football competitions
Nottingham Forest F.C. in European football

References

External links
Summary from UEFA
Summary from RSSSF

Super Cup
1979
International club association football competitions hosted by Spain
International club association football competitions hosted by England
Supercup
Super Cup 1979
Super Cup 1979
UEFA
January 1980 sports events in Europe
February 1980 sports events in Europe
1970s in Nottingham
Sports competitions in Barcelona
1980s in Barcelona
1980 in Catalonia
1980s in Nottingham